Tully Marshall (born William Phillips; April 10, 1864 – March 10, 1943) was an American character actor. He had nearly a quarter century of theatrical experience before his debut film appearance in 1914 which led to a film career spanning almost three decades.

Early years
Marshall was born in Nevada City, California. He attended private schools and Santa Clara College, from which he graduated with an engineering degree.
)

Stage

Marshall began acting on the stage at 19, appearing in Saratoga at the Winter Garden in San Francisco on March 8, 1883. He played a wide variety of roles on Broadway from 1887. His Broadway credits include The Clever Ones (1914).

For several years, Marshall played with a variety of stock theater troupes, including both acting and being stage manager for E. H. Sothern's company.

Film

In 1914, Marshall arrived in Hollywood. His screen debut was in Paid in Full (1914). By the time D. W. Griffith cast him as the High Priest of Bel in Intolerance (1916), he had already appeared in a number of silent films.

His career continued to thrive during the sound era and he remained busy for the remaining three decades of his life. He played a vast array of drunken trail scouts, lovable grandpas, unforgiving fathers, sinister attorneys and lecherous aristocrats. He is arguably most widely known today for his portrayal of John Wayne's sidekick in the lavish widescreen epic Western The Big Trail (1930) directed by Raoul Walsh, shot on location all across the American West, and starring Wayne in his first leading role. In one of Marshall's last films, This Gun for Hire (1942) starring Alan Ladd, he played a treacherously sinister nitrogen industrialist.

Personal life
Marshall was married to screenwriter, playwright, actress and head of her own studio Marion Fairfax from 1899 to his death in 1943. Fairfax died in 1970 at age 94.

Death
Marshall died on March 10, 1943, age 78, after a heart attack at his home in Encino, California. His grave is located in Hollywood Forever Cemetery.

Filmography

[[File:Ball of Fire2.jpg|right|thumb|263px|Marshall, Gary Cooper and Dan Duryea in Ball of Fire (1941)]]Paid in Full (1914) – Joe BrooksThe Sable Lorcha (1915) – SoyThe Painted Soul (1915)Let Katie Do It (1916) – Oliver PutnamMartha's Vindication (1916) – Sell HawkinsA Child of the Paris Streets (1916) – Jacques DufraneThe Devil's Needle (1916) – John MinturnIntolerance (1916) – High Priest of Bel / Friend of the MusketeerOliver Twist (1916) – FaginJoan the Woman (1916) – L'OiseleurThe Fatal Glass of Beer (1916) – Cousin HenryEverybody's Doing It (1916) – CrookThe Golden Fetter (1917) – Henry SladeA Romance of the Redwoods (1917) – Sam SparksUnconquered (1917) – JukeThe Countess Charming (1917) – Dr. John CavendishThe Devil-Stone (1917) – Silas MartinA Modern Musketeer (1917) – James BrownThe Things We Love (1918) – Henry D. KenwoodThe Whispering Chorus (1918) – F.P. ClumleyM'Liss (1918) – Judge Joshua McSnagleyOld Wives for New (1918) – SimcoxWe Can't Have Everything (1918) – The DirectorBound in Morocco (1918) – Ali Pah ShushThe Man from Funeral Range (1918) – Frank BeekmanToo Many Millions (1918) – Artemus WilkinsArizona (1918) – Unknown roleThe Squaw Man (1918) – Sir John ApplegateCheating Cheaters (1919) – Ira LazarreMaggie Pepper (1919) – Sam DarkinThe Girl Who Stayed at Home (1919) – Cutie's Old FriendDaughter of Mine (1919) – Pap Mendelsohn / Lord NoblebrowThe Lady of Red Butte (1919) – Spanish EdThe Crimson Gardenia (1919) – Alfred le DucThe Grim Game (1919) – Richard Raver
 Her Kingdom of Dreams (1919) – LangleyThe Lottery Man (1919) – Unknown roleThe Life Line (1919) – Joe HeckettHawthorne of the U.S.A. (1919) – NitchiEverywoman (1919) – PuffDouble Speed (1920) – Donald McPhersonExcuse My Dust (1920) – President MutchlerThe Gift Supreme (1920) – Irving StaggThe Dancin' Fool (1920) – Charle HarkinsSick Abed (1920) – ChalmersThe Slim Princess (1920) – PapovaHonest Hutch (1920) – Thomas GunnisonHer Beloved Villain (1920) – Dr. Joseph Poulard
 The Little 'Fraid Lady (1920) – GironWhat Happened to Rosa (1920) – Percy Peacock
 The Cup of Life (1921) – Chan Chang
 Silent Years (1921) – Captain LongvilleHail the Woman (1921) – 'Odd Jobs Man'Lotus Blossom (1921) – Quong FooAny Night (1922) – Jerry Maguire (The Weasel)Penrod (1922) – Mr. Schofield
 The Lying Truth (1922) – Horace ToddToo Much Business (1922) – Amos CombyIs Matrimony a Failure? (1922) – Amos SaxbyThe Ladder Jinx (1922) – Peter Stalton
 Fools of Fortune (1922) – Scenery SimsWithout Compromise (1922) – Samuel McAllisterThe Village Blacksmith (1922) – Squire Ezra BrighamGood Men and True (1922) – Fite
 The Super-Sex (1922) – Mr. HigginsDeserted at the Altar (1922) – Squire SimpsonOnly a Shop Girl (1922) – Watkins' Store Manager
 The Marriage Chance (1922) – Timothy LambThe Beautiful and Damned (1922) – Adam Patch
 Dangerous Trails (1923) – Steve BradleyThe Covered Wagon (1923) – Jim BridgerFools and Riches (1923) – John DorganLaw of the Lawless (1923) – Ali Mechmet
 Temporary Marriage (1923) – Hugh Manners, a lawyerThe Brass Bottle (1923) – Professor HamiltonBroken Hearts of Broadway (1923) – Barney Ryan
 The Barefoot Boy (1923) – Tom AdamsHis Last Race (1923) – Mr. StrongThe Hunchback of Notre Dame (1923) – El Rey Luis XIDefying Destiny (1923) – Dr. GregoryThundergate (1923) – Suen TungRichard the Lion-Hearted (1923) – Archbishop of TyreThe Meanest Man in the World (1923) – ClientPonjola (1923) – Count BlauhimelThe Dangerous Maid (1923) – Simon (the peddler)
 Let's Go (1923) – Ezra SprowlHer Temporary Husband (1923) – John IngramThe Stranger (1924) – The StrangerPagan Passions (1924) – Dr. Trask
 The Right of the Strongest (1924) – 'Mister' Sykes
 Hold Your Breath (1924) – BlakeFor Sale (1924) – Harrison BatesPassion's Pathway (1924) – ButlerAlong Came Ruth (1924) – Israel Hubbard
 Reckless Romance (1924) – Judge SomersHe Who Gets Slapped (1924) – Count ManciniThe Ridin' Kid from Powder River (1924) – The SpiderSmouldering Fires (1925) – ScottyThe Talker (1925) – Henry Fells 
 Anything Once (1925) – Mr. NixonThe Half-Way Girl (1925) – The CrabThe Merry Widow (1925) – Baron SadojaThe Pace That Thrills (1925) – Hezekiah SimsClothes Make the Pirate (1925) – ScuteTorrent (1926) – Don AndrésOld Loves and New (1926) – HoseinHer Big Night (1926) – J.Q. Adams, reporterTwinkletoes (1926) – Dad MinasiJim, the Conqueror (1926) – Dave MahlerBeware of Widows (1927) – Peter ChadwickThe Cat and the Canary (1927) – Roger CrosbyThe Gorilla (1927) – William TownsendDrums of Love (1928) – BopiMad Hour (1928) – LawyerThe Trail of '98 (1928) – Salvation Jim
 The Perfect Crime (1928) – FrisbieAlias Jimmy Valentine (1928) – AveryConquest (1928) – Dr. GerryQueen Kelly (1929) – Jan Vryheid (uncredited)Redskin (1929) – Navajo JimThe Bridge of San Luis Rey (1929) – A TownsmanThunderbolt (1929) – WardenThe Mysterious Dr. Fu Manchu (1929) – Chinese Ambassador (uncredited)Skin Deep (1929) – Dr. Bruce LangdonThe Show of Shows (1929) – Performer in "The Pirate"/Soldier (segment "Rifle Execution")Tiger Rose (1929) – Hector McCollinsBurning Up (1930) – Dave GentryShe Couldn't Say No (1930) – Big JohnMammy (1930) – SlatsUnder a Texas Moon (1930) – Gus AldrichRedemption (1930) – ArtimievMurder Will Out (1930) – Dr. MansfieldNumbered Men (1930) – Lemuel BarnesDancing Sweeties (1930) – Pa CleaverCommon Clay (1930) – W.H. YatesThe Big Trail (1930) – ZekeOne Night at Susie's (1930) – Buckeye BillTom Sawyer (1930) – Muff PotterFighting Caravans (1931) – Jim BridgerThe Virtuous Husband (1931) – Ezra HunniwellThe Millionaire (1931) – BriggsThe Unholy Garden (1931) – Baron de JongheBroken Lullaby (1932) – Gravedigger (uncredited)The Hatchet Man (1932) – Long Sen YatThe Beast of the City (1932) – MichaelsArséne Lupin (1932) – Gaston Gourney-MartinScarface (1932) – Managing EditorScandal for Sale (1932) – SimpkinsGrand Hotel (1932) – GerstenkornNight Court (1932) – GroganStrangers of the Evening (1932) – Robert DanielsTwo-Fisted Law (1932) – Sheriff MalcolmThe Hurricane Express (1932, 12-part serial) – Howard EdwardsThe Hollywood Handicap (1932, Short) – Minor RoleExposure (1932) – John WardKlondike (1932) – Editor HinmanThe Cabin in the Cotton (1932) – SlickRed Dust (1932) – "Mac" McQuarg, overseerAfraid to Talk (1932) – District Attorney. AndersonNight of Terror (1933) – Richard RinehartCorruption (1933) – GormanFighting with Kit Carson (1933) – Jim Bridge [Chs. 1–2]Laughing at Life (1933) – StoneMassacre (1934) – JakeMurder on the Blackboard (1934) – Mr. MacFarlandBlack Fury (1935) – PooleDiamond Jim (1935) – MinisterA Tale of Two Cities (1935) – WoodcutterCalifornia Straight Ahead! (1937) – HarrisonSouls at Sea (1937) – PecoraShe Asked for It (1937) – Old Man StettinStand-In (1937) – Fowler PettypackerThat Navy Spirit (1937) – The 'Admiral'Mr. Boggs Steps Out (1938) – Morton RossA Yank at Oxford (1938) – CephasArsène Lupin Returns (1938) – MonelleMaking the Headlines (1938) – Stuart HackettCollege Swing (1938) – Grandpa Alden (uncredited)Hold That Kiss (1938) – Mr. Lazarus – Travel Customer (uncredited)The Kid from Texas (1939) – Adam LambertBlue Montana Skies (1939) – SteveInvisible Stripes (1939) – Old PeterBrigham Young (1940) – JudgeYouth Will Be Served (1940) – Rufus BrittGo West (1940) – Dan Wilson (uncredited)Chad Hanna (1940) – Mr. MottFor Beauty's Sake (1941) – Julius H. PringleSergeant York (1941) – Uncle Lige (uncredited)Ball of Fire (1941) – Prof. RobinsonThis Gun for Hire (1942) – Alvin BrewsterMoontide (1942) – Mr. SimpsonTen Gentlemen from West Point (1942) – GrandpaBehind Prison Walls (1943) – James J. MacGlennonHitler's Madman (1943) – Teacher (uncredited) (final film)

Stage plays

 Because She Loved Him So (1899)
 Sky Farm (1902)
 Hearts Aflame (1902)
 The Best of Friends (1903)
 An African Millionaire (1904)
 Just Out of College (1905)
 The Stolen Story (1906)
 The Builders (1907)
 Paid in Full (1908)
 The City (1910)
 The Talker (1912)
 The Girl and the Pennant (1913)
 The House of Bondage (1914)
 The Clever Ones (1915)
 The Trap'' (1915)

References

External links

Literature on Tully Marshall

1864 births
1943 deaths
Male actors from California
American male film actors
American male silent film actors
American theatre directors
American theatre managers and producers
Burials at Hollywood Forever Cemetery
People from Nevada City, California
19th-century American male actors
American male stage actors
20th-century American male actors
Male Western (genre) film actors